Copyright in South Africa consists of various classes of works of intellectual property, which in terms of section 2(1) of the Copyright Act 98 of 1978 are eligible for copyright and that copyright can exist in them if they are original and comply with certain requirements. The classes of works include literary works, musical works, artistic works, cinematograph films, sound recordings, and broadcasts. This article is about cinematograph film and the registration of copyright.

In South Africa, both the Registration of Copyright in Cinematograph Films Act and the Copyright Act  govern the registration of copyright in cinematograph films. The registration and enforcement of the copyright in cinematograph films is regulated by the Companies and Intellectual Property Commission (CIPC).

The registering of copyright in cinematograph films in South Africa is administered by the Registrar and the CIPC. Section 6(1) of the Registration of Copyright in Cinematograph Films Act states that "only the owner of a cinematograph film may apply for a copyright and pay the prescribed fee", this is also stated in the Copyright Act. Section 6(2) provides that "the registrar may accept or reject the application as they deem fit, with the accepted applications being published with any conditions or limitations. The applicant has six months to register their trademark after the application is advertised."

Definition of cimematograph films 

In terms of section (1) of the Copyright Act, cinematograph film means "any fixation or storage by any means whatsoever on film or any other material of data, signals or a sequence of images capable, when used in conjunction with any other mechanical, electrical or other device, or being seen as a moving picture and of reproduction, and includes the sounds embodies in a sound-track associated with the film, but does not include a computer program". In Nintendo Co Ltd v Golden China TV Game Center and others, cinematograph films are not limited to movies but also include video games, music videos, documentary films, YouTube videos and TikTok videos.

Provision is also made in the definition to protect the soundtrack of a film, which means if someone were to use a sound recording as the soundtrack of a movie, the sound recording will also benefit from the copyright protection associated with the film. The categories of protection in cinematograph films also include elements such as the script and screenplay.

Positive effects of registration in the lives or work of potential creators 
There are multiple benefits and positive effects that come with the registration of copyright in cinematograph films in South Africa. Section 8(1) of the Copyrights Act states that having copyright in cinematograph films grants exclusive rights to authorize or to perform acts such as to reproduce the film in any matter, to publicize the film, broadcast the film, adapt the film and grants exclusive rights to authorize the direct or indirect hiring of such production through trading the copy of the film.

The registration of cinematograph films also grants the owner the recognition they deserve, the right to monetary benefits from their work, and to protect their work from infringement. Economic protection is also present, monetary loss is prevented when someone other that the copyright holder uses and distributes the films for their own benefit. A public record of ownership is established which in turn deters infringements, and any infringements have legal consequences that owners can rely on.

Negative effects of registration in the lives or work of potential creators 
The copyright law in South Africa has positive and negative elements that "promote and pose barries of free expression and development of creative industries'. Copyright laws promote cinematograph films by providing exclusive rights of production which permit filmmakers to sell and distribute their work but sometimes films will require the use of historical and illustrative content in their work, which compromise the exclusive rights of other creators.

The Copyright Act is meant to protect the production of creators of cinematograph films, but such works actually lack copyright protection. Section 2(1)(c) of the Copyright Act creates a statutory default vesting copyright in a film in the party commissioning the work rather than the film's owner or author. South African filmmakers also have a lack of exploitation of user rights, as it is very expensive and time-consuming to get copyright clearance for the use of historical footage and music of other works in their films, making it difficult to properly and smoothly produce their creativity in the film industry.

Another negative element present in the registration of copyright in cinematograph films is the expiration of such registration. When the term of copyright expires, the work or production becomes part of the public domain. The expiration tears down a lot of restrictions that were present, enabling anyone access to the works or production and use of such works without the author's permission, which in turn is detrimental to the making of revenue of the author's work.

References 

South African intellectual property law
Copyright law